The National Unity Movement is the name of several political parties:

 National Unity Movement (Nicaragua)
 National Unity Movement, see 1996 Sierra Leonean general election
 National Unity Movement of Equatorial Guinea, see 1968 Spanish Guinean general election
 Russian National Unity movement

See also
 Democratic National Union Movement, a Cambodian political party
 National Solidarity Movement of Afghanistan